Patrick Pedersen (born 25 November 1991) is a Danish footballer who plays as a striker for Valur.

Career
In December 2015, Pedersen signed for Norwegian Tippeligaen side Viking FK.

He got his league debut in Viking's first game of the season away against Vålerenga on 14 March 2016. Viking won the game 0–2.

Pedersen scored his first goal for Viking on 13 April in the Norwegian Cup against Vardeneset. The match ended 1–5 to Viking, and Pedersen scored four of the five goals for Viking. His other cup goal came against Vard Haugesund a few weeks later.

Despite being top scorer in Iceland, it took quite a while for Pedersen to score his first league goal for Viking. His first goal however, was not only an important one, but also a beautiful goal. Opponent Odd was leading 2–1 with a few seconds left before full-time. Then Pedersen, which came in as a substitute, got the ball and shot it right into the top corner. The game was drawn 2–2, and each team got a point. This match was played on 24 July, and ended Pedersen's many months of missing the target.

After the spell in Norway, he returned to Iceland to play for Valur.

In December 2018, Pedersen signed for Moldovan side FC Sheriff Tiraspol, leaving them on 1 July 2019.

Career statistics

References

1991 births
Living people
Danish men's footballers
Association football forwards
Vendsyssel FF players
Valur (men's football) players
Úrvalsdeild karla (football) players
Viking FK players
Eliteserien players
FC Sheriff Tiraspol players
Moldovan Super Liga players
Danish expatriate men's footballers
Expatriate footballers in Iceland
Expatriate footballers in Norway
Expatriate footballers in Moldova
Danish expatriate sportspeople in Iceland
Danish expatriate sportspeople in Norway
Danish expatriate sportspeople in Moldova
People from Hirtshals
Sportspeople from the North Jutland Region